Dinnington Main F.C. was an English association football club based in Dinnington, Rotherham, South Yorkshire.

History 
Little is known of the club other than that it competed in the FA Cup on numerous occasions either side of the First World War.

Notable former players 
Players that have played in the Football League either before or after playing for Dinnington Main –

 Percy Downes
 John Lang
 Dick Neal

League and cup history 

* League play-off winners

Honours

League 
 Hatchard League
 Champions: 1909–10, 1910–11
 Portland Senior League
 Promoted: 1907–08

Cup 
None

Records 
 Best FA Cup performance: 1st Qualifying Round, 1922–23

References 

Defunct football clubs in South Yorkshire
Defunct football clubs in England
Hatchard League
Sheffield Association League
Mining association football teams in England